Canmer is an unincorporated community in Hart County, Kentucky, United States.

References

Unincorporated communities in Hart County, Kentucky
Unincorporated communities in Kentucky